Lalpur is a village in Kanpur Dehat district in the state of Uttar Pradesh, India.

It is located in Akbarpur Tehsil.

Transport
Lalpur Railway Station is on the railway line connecting Jhansi with Kanpur. 
Jhansi-Lucknow Passenger and Jhansi-Kanpur Passenger are among the main trains that pass through this station. 
To the south-west is Malasa Railway Station, the nearest station. Going north-east, Tilaunchi Railway Station is the station next to Lalpur. Kanpur Central Railway Station is The nearest major railhead.
The Station Code is: LLR

Villages in Kanpur Dehat district